Heinz Michallik (born 21 July 1947) is a German former professional footballer who played as a defender.

Career
Born in Hamm, Michallik played for DJK Gütersloh, Borussia Mönchengladbach, FC Augsburg and TSV Neusäß.

References

1947 births
Living people
Sportspeople from Hamm
German footballers
Association football defenders
FC Gütersloh 2000 players
Borussia Mönchengladbach players
FC Augsburg players
Bundesliga players
2. Bundesliga players
Footballers from North Rhine-Westphalia
West German footballers